Carl Jordan may refer to:

 Carl F. Jordan (fl. 1950s–2020s), professor of ecology
 Carl Friedrich Wilhelm Jordan (1819–1904), German writer and politician

See also
Karl Jordan (disambiguation)